Womesh Chunder Bonnerjee (or Umesh Chandra Banerjee by current English orthography of Bengali names; 29 December 1844 – 21 July 1906) was an Indian barrister. He was a co-founder and the first president of Indian National Congress.

Born on 1844 at Calcutta, he studied at the Oriental Seminary and the Hindu School. His career began in 1862 when he joined the firm of W. P. Gillanders, attorneys of the Calcutta Supreme Court, as a clerk where he acquired a knowledge of law. In 1864 he was sent to England  where he joined the Middle Temple and was called to the Bar in June 1867. He returned to Calcutta in 1868 and within a few years he became the most sought after barrister in the High Court. He was the first Indian to act as a Standing Counsel, in which capacity he officiated four times  1882, 1884, 1886-87. In 1883 he defended Surendranath Banerjee in contempt of court case against him in the Calcutta High Court. He was the fellow of Calcutta University and was the president of its law faculty. He retired from the Calcutta bar in 1901.

He presided over the first session of the Indian National Congress held at Bombay in 1885 from 28 to 31 December. In the 1886 session held at Calcutta, he proposed the formation of standing committees of the Congress in each province for the better co-ordination of its work and it was on this occasion that he advocated that the Congress should confine its activities to political matters only. He was the president of the Indian National Congress again in the 1892 session in Allahabad where he denounced the position that India had to prove for worthiness of political freedom.

He moved to Britain and practiced before the Privy Council. He financed the British Committee of Congress and its journals in London. In 1865 Dadabhai Naoroji founded the London Indian society and Bonnerjee was made its general secretary. When Bonnerjee became the Congress president Naoroji along with him, Eardley Norton and William Digby opened The Congress Political Agency, a branch of Congress in London. He unsuccessfully contested the 1892 United Kingdom general election as a Liberal party candidate for the Barrow and Furness seat. In 1893, Naoroji, Bonnerjee and Badruddin Tyabji founded the Indian Parliamentary Committee in England.

Birth and Ancestry
Bonnerjee was born on 2 December 1844 at Calcutta (now Kolkata), in the present-day state of West Bengal. He belonged to a very respectable Rarhi Kulin Brahmin family who hailed from Baganda, located west of the town of Howrah in present-day state of West Bengal. His grandfather Pitambur Bonnerjee first migrated to Calcutta (now Kolkata) and settled there. From his mother's side, Womesh Chandra was descended from the renowned Sanskrit scholar and philosopher Pundit Juggonath Turkopunchanun of Tribeni, Hooghly District in present-day West Bengal.

Early days 

Bonnerjee studied at the Oriental Seminary and the Hindu School. In 1859, he married Hemangini Motilal. His career began in 1862 when he joined the firm of W. P. Gillanders, attorneys of the Calcutta Supreme Court, as a clerk. In this post he acquired a good knowledge of law which greatly helped him in his later career. In 1864 he was sent to England through a scholarship from Mr. R. J. Jijibhai of Bombay where he joined the Middle Temple and was called to the Bar in June 1867. On his return to Calcutta in 1868, he found a patron in Sir Charles Paul, Barrister-at-Law of the Calcutta High Court. Another barrister, J. P. Kennedy, also greatly helped him to establish his reputation as a lawyer. Within a few years he became the most sought after barrister in the High Court. He was the first Indian to act as a Standing Counsel, in which capacity he officiated four times  1882, 1884, 1886-87. In 1883 he defended Surendranath Banerjee in the famous contempt of court case against him in the Calcutta High Court. He was the fellow of Calcutta University and was the president of its law faculty and often represented it in the legislative council. He retired from the Calcutta bar in 1901.

As a president of Indian National Congress 

He presided over the first session of the Indian National Congress held at Bombay in 1885 from 28 to 31 December and attended by 72 members. In the 1886 session held at Calcutta, under the presidency of Dadabhai Naoroji, he proposed the formation of standing committees of the Congress in each province for the better co-ordination of its work and it was on this occasion that he advocated that the Congress should confine its activities to political matters only, leaving the question of social reforms to other organizations. He was the president of the Indian National Congress again in the 1892 session in Allahabad where he denounced the position that India had to prove for worthiness of political freedom. He moved to Britain and practiced before the Privy Council. He financed the British Committee of Congress and its journals in London. 
In 1865 Dadabhai Naoroji founded the London Indian society and Bonnerjee was made its general secretary. In December 1866, Naoroji dissolved the society and formed East Indian Association. When Bonnerjee became the Congress president Naoroji along with him, Eardley Norton and William Digby opened The Congress Political Agency, a branch of Congress in London. He lived in Croydon and named his residence after his birthplace Khidirpur. The Liberal party made him his candidate for the Barrow and Furness seat in 1892. Bonnerjee was defeated by Charles Cayzer, a Tory candidate. In the same elections Naoroji won the Finsbury Central constituency and defeated his nearest rival by a narrow margin of only 5 votes. Naoroji became the first Indian member of the British Parliament. In 1893, Naoriji, Bonnerjee and Badruddin Tyabji founded the Indian Parliamentary Committee in England.

Personal life
A daughter, Janaki Majumdar, studied natural science, chemistry, zoology and physiology at Newnham College, Cambridge University while another daughter, Susila Anita Bonnerjee was a doctor, teacher, and suffragette.

References

External links 
 Indian National Congress Website
 W.C. Bonnerjee : a sketch of his life and career

1844 births
1906 deaths
Bengali activists
Bengali lawyers
Presidents of the Indian National Congress
Indian barristers
Members of the Middle Temple
Politicians from Kolkata
Indian independence activists from West Bengal
Oriental Seminary alumni
Hindu School, Kolkata alumni
Indian National Congress politicians from West Bengal
19th-century Indian lawyers
People from Kolkata
19th-century Indian politicians
20th-century Indian politicians
20th-century Indian lawyers